René Audet (January 18, 1920 – June 12, 2011) was a Canadian bishop of the Roman Catholic Church. 

Audet was born in Montreal, Quebec and ordained a priest May 30, 1948. He was appointed Auxiliary archbishop of the Archdiocese of Ottawa as well as Titular bishop of Chonochora on May 21, 1963, and ordained on July 31, 1963. On January 3, 1968, he was appointed bishop of the Diocese of Joliette. He resigned from that position on October 31, 1990.

References

External links
Catholic-Hierarchy
of Ottawa
of Joliette

1920 births
2011 deaths
Bishops appointed by Pope Paul VI
20th-century Roman Catholic bishops in Canada
Clergy from Montreal
Roman Catholic bishops of Ottawa–Cornwall